is a railway station in Hyōgo-ku, Kobe, Hyōgo Prefecture, Japan.

Lines
Kobe Municipal Subway
Seishin-Yamate Line (S06)
Kobe Electric Railway
Arima Line, Kobe Kosoku Line - Minatogawa Station
Kobe City Bus: Minatogawa-koen-nishiguchi
Kobe City Transportation Promotion Co. Yamate Route: Minatogawa-koen-higashiguchi

Layout
This station has a concourse on the 1st basement, and an island platform serving 2 tracks on the 2nd basement.

Surroundings
Minatogawa Park (upper the station)
Hyogo Ward Office
Hyogo Police Station
Hyogo Fire Station
Palcinema Shinkouen

Railway stations in Hyōgo Prefecture
Stations of Kobe Municipal Subway
Railway stations in Japan opened in 1983